Tamašoŭka (Tamašoŭka, Tomašivka) is a village in the Brest oblast, in the Brest region of Belarus. It is the administrative center of the Tamašoŭka village council. The village is essentially a settlement small town, an agrotown, situated near the tripoint joining Poland, Ukraine, and Belarus, in the attractive touristic region of Polesia. The town is located near the Bug River, 170 meters above sea level.

In 2009, the settlement had 1131 inhabitants., and 1235 in 2019. Tamašoŭka has a high school, library, and culture house. The built-up areas end at Brest inbound rail, there is a railway station connected to Wlodawa. There is also a sanatorium in the settlement. Attractions include the Orthodox Church. The museum of astronautics is located on the premises of the high school.

History

Russia and the First World War 

A village founded at the turn of the 19th and 20th centuries on the territory of the Przyborowo estate, the Grodno governorate at that time by Tomasz Zamoyski (1861-1935) from the Zamoyski line of Włodawa; probably after the Chełm-Brest railway line was built (1887). At that time, the Włodawa railway station was built in the village. In 1900, a wood materials factory for the District Railway Directorate in Vilnius was established in Tamašoŭka. During World War I, especially in 1915, fights took place in the vicinity of the town, the remains of which are the graves of German, Austro-Hungarian, Russian, and Polish soldiers (a total of 1,346 people).

Second Republic 

In the interwar period, the town originally belonged to the Przyborowo commune in the Brest powiat of the Polesie Voivodeship. The 1921 census under the name Tomaszówka includes only a forester's lodge with 3 houses and 18 inhabitants: 8 men, 10 women. In terms of religion, they were mainly Roman Catholics (17) and 1 Orthodox. Apart from 1 Belarusian, all declared Polish nationality (17). Taken separately, the Włodawka railway station (today in Tamašoŭka) had a total of 24 houses. 185 people lived here: 98 men, 87 women. In terms of religion, there were 128 Roman Catholics, 46 Orthodox, and 11 Jews. 129 people declared Polish nationality, 36 - Belarusian, 11 - Jewish, and 9 - Russian. In 1928, along with the entire commune of Przyborowo, it became part of the commune of Damačava.

The town was connected with the western bank of the Bug by a railway bridge near Orchówek and a road bridge in Włodawka. During the Second Polish Republic, favorable conditions for the development of Tamašoŭka were created. Immediately after the war, count Tomasz Zamoyski divided his property in Tamašoŭka, and the plots were bought by Jews from Włodawka. Tamašoŭka was connected with Włodawa and the left-bank areas of the Bug River by numerous social and economic ties. Notably, the settlement was covered by the post office in Włodawa. The youth of Tomaszów constituted a significant percentage of the students of the gymnasium in Włodawa. The land of Włodawa townspeople, situated on the eastern bank of the river, stretched to the village buildings. To settle this matter, the municipal office of Włodawa applied in 1930 to extend the city's borders, inter alia, by connecting Tamašoŭka with the Włodawa railway station. The project of joining the territories beyond the Bug River to Włodawa was partially dealt with the issue of legal differences between the areas of the former Congress Kingdom and the former taken lands.

In the interwar period, Tamašoŭka became a center of trade in wood (in various forms), fish, cattle, and flour. Wood from state forests or the Zamoyski estates was sawn in three local sawmills that were built at that time. The fish came from the nearby lakes and fish farms of the Polesie and Wołyński provinces. The flour was produced in a mill in Tomaszów, partly from wheat coming to the Włodawa railway station.

Good transport connections, the vicinity of the administrative and economic center in Włodawa (5 km away), and attractive tourist conditions, attracting summer visitors, resulted in the rapid development of Tamašoŭka at the expense of the decaying Włodawka, and even Włodawa, deprived of its railway station. In the years 1930-1937 the population of Tamašoŭka doubled, to 3,000 inhabitants.

The Second World War 

At the beginning of September 1939, the Włodawa bridges were bombed. Many Poles were fleeing the German army in the village, including many Jews. Inspired by the NKVD, militants began to operate in the Tamašoŭka area, murdering Polish officers and intellectuals. On September 17, German troops entered the village, which then withdrew, giving this area under the control of the Red Army. With the establishment of Soviet power, Tamašoŭka became part of the BSSR.

In 1940, with the consent of the Soviet authorities and with the participation of representatives of the Red Army, NKVD, and local officials, the Germans solemnly exhumed the bodies of German soldiers who died at the hands of Poles during the September campaign and were deposited at the local cemetery. The exhumed bodies were then transported to the Reich.

Between 1939-1941, when Tamašoŭka was in the border region between the Third Reich and the Soviet Union, there existed two outlets forces borders.

After the Nazi aggression on the USSR, on June 22, 1941, the village was under German occupation. A particularly cruel fate befell the local Jews shot after the liquidation of the local ghetto. The bodies of 2,200 murdered rest in a mass grave.

On July 22, 1944, Tamašoŭka was captured by the troops of the 1st Byelorussian Front. After the war, it found itself within the borders of Belarus.

After World War II 

In June 1949, a collective farm named after Dzerzhinsky was organized in the village of Prybarava which is included in the Tamašoŭka village council.

On December 31, 2011, the first case of jackals in Belarus was recorded near the villages of Tamašoŭka and Selyakhi in the Brest district.

Present-day 

Currently, the town boasts mainly a museum of cosmonautics (since 1978) at the local secondary school. There are, among others a bench where the following were reportedly sitting: Pyotr Klimuk (born in the nearby Komarówka, Soviet and Belarusian cosmonaut) and Pyotr Prakapowich, president of the National Bank of the Republic of Belarus in 1998-2011. The brother of the latter, Wasilij, is the director of an agricultural enterprise in Tamašoŭka (OAO Komarowka).

In addition, the village has a hotel, restaurant, and the Belarusian-Ukrainian border crossing: Tamašoŭka-Pulemiec, the railway station "Włodawa" in Tamašoŭka and the Orthodox parish deanery (благочиние) Brest-Region, Brest eparchy and the Kobrin Exarchate Belarusian Moscow Patriarchate at the Church of the Protection of the Mother of God (Pokrovska, Свято-Покровская церковь).

For several years, at various levels, talks were held on the construction of a bridge over the Bug River and the launch of the Polish-Belarusian border crossing point Włodawa-Tamašoŭka

Historical monuments 

 Cemetery of World War I soldiers.
 Fraternal grave of border guards from 1941.
 Grave of victims of fascism from 1941 onwards.
 The building of the Włodawa railway station from the beginning of the 20th century

Notable people 
 Pyotr Prakapovich - Belarusian statesman, Hero of Belarus, Chairman of the Board of the National Bank of the Republic of Belarus (1998-2011). He studied at Tamašoŭka High School.
Pyotr Klimuk - Soviet cosmonaut - Belarusian, twice Hero of the Soviet Union, Colonel-General of Aviation

References

Works cited 

 

Populated places in Brest Region